

Countess of Montpensier

House of Valois, 1362?–1434

House of Bourbon-Montpensier, 1434–1523

Duchess of Montpensier

House of Bourbon-Vendôme, 1561–1627

House of Bourbon-Orléans

House of Bourbon-Orléans (in pretence)

See also
Duchess of Berry
List of consorts of Bourbon
List of consorts of Orléans
List of consorts of Auvergne

 
 
House of Bourbon-Montpensier
Montpensier
Montpensier